Mario Camerini (6 February 1895 – 4 February 1981) was an Italian film director and screenwriter.

The cousin of Augusto Genina, Camerini made the most well-known films in Italy during the 1930s, most of them comedies starring Vittorio De Sica. He directed about 50 films till 1972, including 1954's Ulysses with American stars Kirk Douglas and Anthony Quinn, one of the first Europe/US film co-productions. He died in 1981 in Gardone Rivera.

Selected filmography 

 Wally (1923)
Jolly clown da circo (1923)
 The House of Pulcini (1924)
 Voglio tradire mio marito (1925)
 Saetta, principe per un giorno (1925)
 Maciste against the Sheik (1925)
 Kif Tebbi (1928)
 Rails (1929)
 Figaro and His Great Day (1931)
 The Last Adventure (1932)
 What Scoundrels Men Are! (1932)
  Giallo (1933)
 T'amerò sempre (1933)
The Three-Cornered Hat (1935)
 Like the Leaves  (1935)
The Great Appeal (1936)
I'll Give a Million (1936)
But It's Nothing Serious (1936)
Il signor Max (1937)
The Man Who Couldn't Say No (1938)
Department Store (1939)
 Heartbeat (1939)
The Document (1939)
 One Hundred Thousand Dollars (1940)
 A Romantic Adventure (1940)
 The Betrothed  (1941)
Love Story (1942)
 T'amerò sempre (1942)
 Two Anonymous Letters (1945)
 L'angelo e il diavolo (1946)
 The Captain's Daughter  (1947)
The Street Has Many Dreams (1948)
Outlaw Girl (1950)
 Honeymoon Deferred (1951)
 Sunday Heroes (1952)
 Wife for a Night (1952)
 Ulysses (1954)
 The Miller's Beautiful Wife (1955)
 The Awakening (1956)
 Count Max (1957)
 Holiday Island (1957)
 The Awakening (1957)
 First love (1959)
And Suddenly It's Murder! (1960)
 The Italian Brigands (1960)
 Il mistero del tempio indiano (1963)
Kali Yug: Goddess of Vengeance (1963)
Imperfect Murder (1966)
  (1971)
 Don Camillo e i giovani d'oggi (1972)

References

External links 

1895 births
1981 deaths
Film directors from Rome